The New Mexico State Ethics Commission (SEC) is an independent state agency tasked with promoting the integrity of New Mexico State Government through the interpretation, enforcement, and improvement of New Mexico's campaign finance, governmental conduct, procurement, and lobbying laws.

Background 
The SEC was created via constitutional amendment in 2018. In 2019, the New Mexico Legislature passed the State Ethics Commission Act which serves as the enabling legislation for the SEC.

Jurisdiction 
The SEC's jurisdiction began on January 1, 2020. The SEC has authority to adjudicate civil complaints arising under nine laws provided for in the State Ethics Commission Act.

Responsibilities 
In addition to adjudicating ethics complaints, the SEC also provides advisory opinions on ethics issues to persons subject to its jurisdiction, conducts ethics trainings, and is charged with developing and disseminating a model code of ethics.

References

External links 
 

State agencies of New Mexico
Ethics commissions
Government agencies established in 2020
2020 establishments in New Mexico